Gone to Texas is a 1986 American made-for-television biographical film originally titled Houston: The Legend of Texas. It stars Sam Elliott in the title role, and is a biopic of Sam Houston's years as Governor of Tennessee through his involvement in the Texas Revolution.

This production is notable for the complete absence of Davy Crockett in the Battle of the Alamo scenes.

Cast
 Sam Elliott as General Sam Houston
 Claudia Christian as Eliza Allen
 Devon Ericson as Tiana Rogers
 Ned Romero as Cherokee Chief John Jolly
 Ivy Pryce as Erastus "Deaf" Smith
 William Russ as Lieutenant Colonel Bill Travis
 John P. Ryan as President David G. Burnet, President of The Republic of Texas
 Michael Beck as Colonel Jim Bowie
 Bo Hopkins as Colonel Sidney Sherman
 James Stephens as Stephen F. Austin
 Richard Yniguez as General Antonio López de Santa Anna
 Peter Gonzales Falcon as Captain Juan Seguín
 Michael C. Gwynne as Captain Moseley Baker 
 Donald Moffat as Colonel John Allen 
 John Quade as Senator William Stansbury
 Ritch Brinkley as Senator Buckley
 G.D. Spradlin as President Andrew Jackson
 John de Lancie as John Van Fossen 
 Javier Grajeda as Mexican Lawyer
 Robert F. Hoy as Colonel Burleson  
 Cynthia Cuprill as Emily
 Blue Deckert as Thomas Rusk
 Ambrosio Guerra as General Martín Perfecto de Cos 
 Jerry Haynes as Uncle Jimmy
 Brad Leland as Sergeant Quinn
 John B. Wells as Kuykendall
 Dennis Letts as Captain Ross
 Joe Morales as Captain Olivera
 Dave Tanner as George Washington Hockley 
 Luis Munoz as Mexican Judge
 David Peña as Colonel Almonte
 John Nixon as Joe
 Jerry Biggs as The Messenger
 J.D. Feigelson as Military Officer At Wedding Ball
 Andy Stahl as Robinson
 Kevin R. Young as Captain Coleman
 Jimmy Ray Pickens as Taylor
 Roger Ragland as Texan Patriot (uncredited)
 Bill Chemerka as Executed Texan (uncredited)
 James Monroe Black as Colonel James Fannin (uncredited)
 Paul Suarez as Drummer Dick (uncredited)
 Mark Sevier as The Anahuac Delegate (uncredited)
 Katharine Ross as Susannah Dickinson (uncredited)  
 William Schallert as The Narrator

References

External links
 

1986 television films
1980s biographical films
1980s English-language films
American television films
Biographical films about politicians
CBS network films
Cultural depictions of American men
Cultural depictions of Andrew Jackson
Cultural depictions of politicians
Films scored by Dennis McCarthy
Films set in the 19th century
Sam Houston
Texas Revolution films
Films directed by Peter Levin
Cultural depictions of James Bowie